In mathematics, the Gauss–Kuzmin–Wirsing operator is the transfer operator of the Gauss map that takes a positive number to the fractional part of its reciprocal. (This is not the same as the Gauss map in differential geometry.) It is named after Carl Gauss, Rodion Kuzmin, and Eduard Wirsing. It occurs in the study of continued fractions; it is also related to the Riemann zeta function.

Relationship to the maps and continued fractions

The Gauss map  

The Gauss function (map) h is :

where  denotes the floor function.

It has an infinite number of jump discontinuities at x = 1/n, for positive integers n. It is hard to approximate it by a single smooth polynomial.

Operator on the maps 
The Gauss–Kuzmin–Wirsing operator  acts on functions  as

Eigenvalues of the operator

The first eigenfunction of this operator is

which corresponds to an eigenvalue of λ1 = 1. This eigenfunction gives the probability of the occurrence of a given integer in a continued fraction expansion, and is known as the Gauss–Kuzmin distribution.  This follows in part because the Gauss map acts as a truncating shift operator for the continued fractions: if

 

is the continued fraction representation of a number 0 < x < 1, then

 

Because  is conjugate to a Bernoulli shift, the eigenvalue  is simple, and since the operator leaves invariant the Gauss–Kuzmin measure, the operator is ergodic with respect to the measure. This fact allows a short proof of the existence of Khinchin's constant.

Additional eigenvalues can be computed numerically; the next eigenvalue is λ2 = −0.3036630029... 
and its absolute value is known as the Gauss–Kuzmin–Wirsing constant. Analytic forms for additional eigenfunctions are not known.  It is not known if the eigenvalues are irrational.

Let us arrange the eigenvalues of the Gauss–Kuzmin–Wirsing operator according to an absolute value:

It was conjectured in 1995 by Philippe Flajolet and Brigitte Vallée that

In 2018, Giedrius Alkauskas gave a convincing argument that this conjecture can be refined to a much stronger statement:

Continuous spectrum
The eigenvalues form a discrete spectrum, when the operator is limited to act on functions on the unit interval of the real number line.  More broadly, since the Gauss map is the shift operator on Baire space , the GKW operator can also be viewed as an operator on the function space  (considered as a Banach space, with basis functions taken to be the indicator functions on the cylinders of the product topology).  In the later case, it has a continuous spectrum, with eigenvalues in the unit disk  of the complex plane.  That is, given the cylinder , the operator G shifts it to the left: . Taking  to be the indicator function which is 1 on the cylinder (when ), and zero otherwise, one has that .  The series

then is an eigenfunction with eigenvalue . That is, one has  whenever the summation converges: that is, when .

A special case arises when one wishes to consider the Haar measure of the shift operator, that is, a function that is invariant under shifts.  This is given by the Minkowski measure . That is, one has that .

Relationship to the Riemann zeta function
The GKW operator is related to the Riemann zeta function. Note that the zeta function can be written as

which implies that

by change-of-variable.

Matrix elements
That is, let

and write likewise for g(x).  The expansion is made about x = 1 because the GKW operator is poorly behaved at x = 0.  The expansion is made about 1 − x so that we can keep x a positive number, 0 ≤ x ≤ 1. Then the GKW operator acts on the Taylor coefficients as

where the matrix elements of the GKW operator are given by

This operator is extremely well formed, and thus very numerically tractable. The Gauss–Kuzmin constant is easily computed to high precision by numerically diagonalizing the upper-left n by n portion.  There is no known closed-form expression that diagonalizes this operator; that is, there are no closed-form expressions known for the eigenvectors.

Riemann zeta
The Riemann zeta can be written as

Performing the summations, one gets:

where  is the Euler–Mascheroni constant. These  play the analog of the Stieltjes constants, but for the falling factorial expansion. By writing

one gets: a0 = −0.0772156... and a1 = −0.00474863... and so on. The values get small quickly but are oscillatory.  Some explicit sums on these values can be performed.  They can be explicitly related to the Stieltjes constants by re-expressing the falling factorial as a polynomial with Stirling number coefficients, and then solving. More generally, the Riemann zeta can be re-expressed as an expansion in terms of Sheffer sequences of polynomials.

This expansion of the Riemann zeta is investigated in the following references. The coefficients are decreasing as

References

General references
 A. Ya. Khinchin, Continued Fractions, 1935, English translation University of Chicago Press,  1961  (See section 15).
 K. I. Babenko, On a Problem of Gauss, Soviet Mathematical Doklady 19:136–140 (1978) 
 K. I. Babenko and S. P. Jur'ev, On the Discretization of a Problem of Gauss, Soviet Mathematical Doklady 19:731–735 (1978). 
 A. Durner,  On a Theorem of Gauss–Kuzmin–Lévy. Arch. Math. 58, 251–256, (1992). 
 A. J. MacLeod, High-Accuracy Numerical Values of the Gauss–Kuzmin Continued Fraction Problem. Computers Math. Appl. 26, 37–44, (1993).
 E. Wirsing, On the Theorem of Gauss–Kuzmin–Lévy and a Frobenius-Type Theorem for Function Spaces. Acta Arith. 24, 507–528, (1974).

Further reading
 Keith Briggs, A precise computation of the Gauss–Kuzmin–Wirsing constant (2003) (Contains a very  extensive collection of references.)
 Phillipe Flajolet and Brigitte Vallée, On the Gauss–Kuzmin–Wirsing Constant (1995).
 Linas Vepstas  The Bernoulli Operator, the Gauss–Kuzmin–Wirsing Operator, and the Riemann Zeta (2004) (PDF)

External links 
 
 

Continued fractions
Dynamical systems